Cherrier Lake is a body of freshwater in the north-eastern part of Senneterre in the Vallée-de-l'Or Regional County Municipality (RCM), in the administrative region of Abitibi-Témiscamingue, in the province of Quebec, in Canada.

Cherrier Lake is located in the township of Mesplet and Cherrier. Forestry is the main economic activity of the sector. Recreational tourism activities come second.

The hydrographic slope of Cherrier Lake is accessible through a forest road (North-South direction) which passes on the east side of the Saint-Cyr River Valley; in addition, another forest road (East-West direction) serves the north of the Lac Saint-Cyr Biodiversity Reserve.

The surface of Cherrier Lake is usually frozen from early November to mid-May, however, safe ice circulation is generally from mid-November to mid-April.

Geography

Toponymy
The hydronym "Lac Cherrier" is linked to that of the canton of Cherrier.

This hydronym evokes the life work of Como-Séraphin Cherrier (Repentigny, 1798 - Montreal, 1885) who is recognized as a person of exceptional nature, according to the Canadian Prime Minister, Sir Wilfrid Laurier. Having practiced as a lawyer from 1822 to 1860, he pleaded famous causes, notably that where he represented the lords in their claims for compensation, on the occasion of the abolition of the seigneurial regime in 1854. President of the Bar of Montreal (1855- 1856), he was also a professor and dean of the Faculty of Law of Laval University in Montreal (1878-1885), deputy of the County of Montreal (1834-1838), member and tenor of the Patriot Party imprisoned for three months at the events of 1837-1838, opposed to the Union and Confederation. President of the Saint-Jean-Baptiste Society of Montreal in 1852-1853 and philanthropist, he was decorated with the Order of St. Gregory the Great.

The toponym "Lac Cherrier" was made official on December 5, 1968 by the Commission de toponymie du Québec, when it was created.

Notes and references

See also 

Lakes of Abitibi-Témiscamingue
La Vallée-de-l’Or
Nottaway River drainage basin